Sarah Jane Smith: Mirror, Signal, Manoeuvre is a Big Finish Productions audio drama based on the long-running British science fiction television series Doctor Who. It stars Elisabeth Sladen reprising her role as Sarah Jane Smith.

Plot 
Sarah Jane's past catches up with her in the shape of Hilda Winters, who manipulates her into visiting a remote island in the Indian Ocean to investigate a bio-warfare scandal from the 1940s.

Sarah Jane disregards her usual instinct to trust no one, and consequently finds herself set up to take the fall when Miss Winters determines to implicate her as the person responsible for the release of the biological warfare virus, which will kill millions.

Cast
Sarah Jane Smith – Elisabeth Sladen
Hilda Winters – Patricia Maynard
Josh Townsend – Jeremy James
Natalie Redfern – Sadie Miller
Taxi Driver – Mark Donovan
Taxi Driver – Toby Longworth
Wendy Jennings – Louise Faulkner
Doctor Brandt – Peter Miles
Harris – Robin Bowerman

Trivia
 Patricia Maynard reprises her role as Hilda Winters, a character who first appeared in the Fourth Doctor serial Robot (1975).
 Peter Miles appeared in Doctor Who on television with the Third Doctor in Doctor Who and the Silurians (1970) and Invasion of the Dinosaurs (1973), and with the Fourth Doctor in Genesis of the Daleks (1975) (as Security Commander Nyder, Davros's second in command). He subsequently appeared with the Third Doctor in the 1990s in the BBC Radio serial The Paradise of Death.

External links
Big Finish Productions – Sarah Jane Smith: Mirror, Signal, Manoeuvre

Mirror, Signal Manoeuvre
2002 audio plays